Zlobino is a village in Kashinsky District of Tver Oblast, Russia. It is located near the villages of Yurino, Buzykovo, and Miloslavskoye.

History
In 1862 the village was part of the Kashinsky Uyezd and there were 40 men and 48 women.

References 

Rural localities in Kashinsky District
Kashinsky Uyezd